Selastele onustum is a species of sea snail, a marine gastropod mollusk in the family Calliostomatidae.

Description

Distribution
This marine species occurs off New Zealand.

References

External links
 

onustum
Gastropods described in 1924